The European Sports Media (ESM), formerly European Sports Magazines, is an association of football-related publications in Europe.

Members
European Sports Media was established in 1989 as an international body for football journalism. Its nine founding members were: A Bola (Portuguese), Don Balón (Spanish), Sport/Foot Magazine (Belgium), La Gazzetta dello Sport (Italian), kicker (German), Onze Mondial (French), Sport (Switzerland), Voetbal International (Dutch), World Soccer (English).
ESM membership has varied over time. Former members also include France Football.

Current members
  A Bola
  Fanatik
  Frankfurter Allgemeine Zeitung
  La Gazzetta dello Sport
  kicker
  Marca
  nemzeti sport
  So Foot
  Sport Express
  Sport Magazine
  telesport
  Tipsbladet
  Voetbal International
  World Soccer

Awards 
ESM presents the following awards:

 European Golden Shoe. Since the 1996–97 season, ESM annually rewards Europe's most prolific striker with the European Golden Shoe.
 UEFA Men's Player of the Year Award & UEFA Women's Player of the Year Award. Since 2011, in partnership with UEFA, ESM handles the voting and administration for the UEFA Best Men's Player and Women's Player in Europe Awards, which is awarded annually to the outstanding men's and women's players of the European season.
 UEFA Men's Coach of the Year Award & UEFA Women's Coach of the Year Award. Since 2020, in partnership with UEFA, ESM handles the voting and administration for the UEFA Best Men's Coach and Women's Coach in Europe Awards, which is awarded annually to the outstanding men's and women's coaches of the European season.
 ESM Team of the Season. After selecting a Team of the Season for 1994–95, ESM instituted the monthly ESM 11. Each of its members selects the 11 best players in the European leagues each month from September to May. The players who most often appear in those teams are elected into the ESM Team of the Season.

ESM Team of the Season

1990s

2000s

2010s

2020s

By player

References

External links
Official website

Association football magazines